The Municipality of Žiri ( or) is a municipality in northwestern Slovenia. The seat of the municipality is the town of Žiri. The area is part of the traditional Upper Carniola region. The entire municipality is now included in the Upper Carniola Statistical Region.

Settlements
In addition to the municipal seat of Žiri, the municipality also includes the following settlements:

 Brekovice
 Breznica pri Žireh
 Goropeke
 Izgorje
 Jarčja Dolina
 Koprivnik
 Ledinica
 Mrzli Vrh
 Opale
 Osojnica
 Podklanec
 Račeva
 Ravne pri Žireh
 Selo
 Sovra
 Zabrežnik
 Žirovski Vrh

References

External links

 Municipality of Žiri website 
 Municipality of Žiri on Geopedia

 
Ziria
1994 establishments in Slovenia